The Doxa SC are a soccer team based in New Rochelle, New York. They currently competes the Cosmopolitan Soccer League (CSL) and Eastern Premier Soccer League (EPSL).

History

Founded in 1962, the club played the National Challenge Cup in 1973, 1974 and 1975.

Year-by-year

References

Men's soccer clubs in New York (state)
1962 establishments in New York (state)
Association football clubs established in 1962
Cosmopolitan Soccer League